Aalog-Alog is a Philippine sitcom on ABS-CBN. It premiered on July 8, 2006, and concluded on May 5, 2007. It stars comedian Pokwang and starlet Keanna Reeves as Doña Etang and Keanna respectively, friends who become feuding neighbors. The title comes from the Filipino word for "shaking or jiggling back forth" and it can be explained in one of the setting's two houses which leans from side to side like a rocking chair.

Most of the cast had appeared previously as contestants of incarnations of Pinoy Big Brother: Keanna is the winner of the Celebrity Edition; Kim Chiu, who plays Doña Etang's half-Japanese, quarter-Chinese daughter, is the winner of the Teen Edition; Gerald Anderson, also of the Teen Edition, plays Keanna's little brother. Zanjoe Marudo, John Prats (both part of the Celebrity Edition), and Jason Gainza (of the show's first season) play OFWs running around Tokyo being chased by immigration officer Sandaro Yamamoto (played by comedian Ya Chang) after the trio have been overstaying in Japan just to raise funds for their trip home. The trio are former borders of Keanna's home. Pokwang herself was a part of Pinoy Big Brother'''s spin-off, Pinoy Big Brother Buzz.

Cast and characters
 Pokwang as Doña Etang Sukimura
 Keanna Reeves as Keana Padilla
 Kim Chiu as Kim Sukimura
 John Prats as Johnny Montero
 Zanjoe Marudo as Banjoe Rosales
 Gerald Anderson as Gerald Dean Padilla
 Jayson Gainza as Jayson Santiago
 Bentong† as Utoy
 Sammy Lagmay† as Chairman Hero
 Ya Chang as Sandaro Yamamoto

Director
Former noontime show host/singer and current businessman Randy Santiago directed the show.  It was his first time to direct a situational comedy show.  He also co-directed the Lenten specials of Magandang Tanghali Bayan'' with Bobet Vidanes from 1999 to 2002.  His first directorial break was in the GMA noontime show "Salo-Salo Together (SST)" (1993–1995) and also assisted his dad, the famous Pablo Santiago in directing some movies in the 1980s.  He is also known as the owner of the successful chain of Ratsky bar and restaurant.

Aalog-alog was composed of a fun production team headlined by executive producer Jose Antonio Guillero, associate producer Janice Señorin and production assistants Ana Katrina Bañez, Elisa Guinmapang and Katrina Juban. Ricky Victoria serves as the head writer, Rolf Mahilom, Sherwin Buenvenida, Fudgr Deleon and Josel Garlitos completes the creative team.

References

External links
Aalog-Alog at the Internet Movie Database
Aalog-Alog at Telebisyon.net

ABS-CBN original programming
Philippine television sitcoms
2006 Philippine television series debuts
2007 Philippine television series endings
Filipino-language television shows